The 2022–23 Croatian Third Football League (also known as Treća Nogometna Liga and 3. NL) is the 32nd edition of the fourth tier of Croatian football league and 1st season of the restructured Treća nogometna liga.

2022-23 season is the first season where fourth tier competition is named Third Football League, and the first season where fourth tier competition is the highest competition divided in groups (traditionally it being third tier competition).

Winner of every group will qualify for the promotion qualifications, as well as the 14th placed team in Second Football League. Those six teams will battle for 3 open spots in next seasons' Second Football League.

Teams

The league is contested in 5 groups, based on geographic locations, by between 10 and 18 teams. Groups are based on centers: Varaždin (North), Rijeka (West), Zagreb (Center), Osijek (East) and Split (South).

League tables

North
</onlyinclude>

West
</onlyinclude>

Center
</onlyinclude>

East
</onlyinclude>

South
</onlyinclude>

Notes

References 

Croatia
4